('the Book of Occultation') may refer to:

 (al-Nu'mani), a work by the Twelver Shi'ite scholar Muhammad ibn Ibrahim al-Nu'mani (died ) on the occultation of the twelfth Imam Muhammad al-Mahdi
 (al-Tusi), a work by the Twelver Shi'ite scholar Shaykh Tusi (995–1067) on the occultation of the twelfth Imam Muhammad al-Mahdi

See also
, the Shi'ite concept of the concealment or occultation of an Imam

, a work written in 1021 by the Druze leader Hamza ibn Ali after the disappearance of the Fatimid Imam-caliph al-Hakim bi-Amr Allah (985–1021), announcing al-Hakim's occultation
, a work written in 1042 by Hamza ibn Ali's pupil Baha al-Din al-Muqtana, announcing the suspension of Druze missionary activity due to the imminence of the end times